Rock Is Dead was a worldwide arena tour by American rock band Marilyn Manson in 1999. It was the second tour launched in support of their third full-length studio LP, Mechanical Animals, which was released on September 15, 1998.

The tour was a rebranding of the Marilyn Manson and Hole co-headlined Beautiful Monsters tour. While it was initially successful, Beautiful Monsters was marked by numerous and well-publicized fracases between the frontperson of each band on and off-stage. The discord caused a fallout between the two groups which resulted in Hole's departure from the playbill. Marilyn Manson decided to continue the tour and gave the opening act, Monster Magnet, equal billing as co-headliner for Rock is Dead.

Marilyn Manson released two recordings that documented portions of the tour: a live video album titled God Is in the T.V. and a live album titled The Last Tour on Earth.

Background and development

 
After a series of public spats between the extremely outspoken lead vocalists of Hole and Marilyn Manson during their joint Beautiful Monsters Tour, Hole vocalist Courtney Love officially announced their withdrawal on March 14, 1999, as they took the stage at The Forum arena. They went on to do a series of shows in North America before leaving for the United Kingdom to join the Glastonbury Festival.

During Marilyn Manson's performance on the night of Hole's departure, Manson suffered a hairline fracture on one of his ankles while jumping between on-stage platforms. His injury caused the tour to be temporarily suspended while he recuperated. The March 16, 1999 San Diego, California concert was cancelled while the March 17, 1999 Las Vegas, Nevada and March 18, 1999 Phoenix, Arizona engagements were postponed to a later date. In spite of the highly publicized animosity, Manson insisted Hole's departure was "not a personal thing."

The tour resumed on March 21, 1999, rebranded as the Rock Is Dead Tour after the Marilyn Manson single "Rock Is Dead", despite the fact that the name was already being used by American rock bands Korn and Rob Zombie for their own concurrent joint US tour, the Rock is Dead! Tour. This led to a minor dispute that was quickly resolved by both parties. Manson kept all of the remaining scheduled engagements intact.

Now exercising full control over the tour's itinerary, Manson immediately withdrew Imperial Teen's billing in favor of Grammy-nominated American psychobilly band Nashville Pussy, who took over the opening act slot from Monster Magnet beginning from the April 2, 1999 concert at the Memorial Coliseum in Winston-Salem, North Carolina until the completion of all North American dates on the tour. Manson explained to MTV that the initial inclusion of Imperial Teen on the tour was "by Courtney's request. I think we're probably better off, because that would've been an additional torment for our fans that they didn't need." He added that while he enjoyed their music on CD, he felt there was too much difference in their musical and performance approach for their continued inclusion on the tour to work.

Fellow Floridians and longtime friends of the band Jack Off Jill joined Manson's tour for four dates from March 25, 1999, at the Uno Arena in New Orleans until March 30, 1999, at the National Car Center Arena in their shared hometown of Fort Lauderdale, Florida, for both groups' homecoming concert.

Performance and show themes
"Inauguration of the Mechanical Christ" was created as an intro for Marilyn Manson, who would appear fixed to a crucifix made out of television sets as it rose from beneath the stage.

Marilyn Manson would also pose as an officer during "Irresponsible Hate Anthem" and as a finale, Manson's backup singer would arrive as a second officer with a shotgun. The shotgun would fire into Manson's back, splattering blood unto the crowd. With Manson having been 'murdered', his body would be dragged from the stage.

The podium scene during Antichrist Superstar continued to appear for the track of the same name. This led to a slight controversy during what was to be the original final North American tour date. During the Cedar Rapids, Iowa, show, Marilyn Manson was surprised to find the Antichrist Superstar logo on his podium had been replaced with a smiley face, ultimately leading to Manson walking off the stage and not returning.

Set props included a massive lit sign spelling D-R-U-G-S, as well as golden confetti fired often from cannons.

Incidents
Following the aftermath of the Columbine High School massacre in Littleton, Colorado, the band canceled the remaining dates of the tour out of respect for the victims, explaining, "It's not a great atmosphere to be out playing rock 'n' roll shows, for us or the fans." However, Manson steadfastly maintained that music, movies, books or video games are not to blame, stating,

Columbine High School massacre and its immediate aftermath

 
On April 20, 1999, Columbine High School students Eric Harris and Dylan Klebold shot dead 12 students and a teacher and wounded 21 others, before committing suicide. In the aftermath of the school shooting, the band were widely reported to have influenced the killings; early media reports alleged that the shooters were fans, and were wearing the group's T-shirts during the massacre. Although these claims were later proven to be false (through tapes recorded by the perpetrators), speculation in national media and among the public continued to blame Manson's music and imagery for inciting Harris and Klebold. Later reports revealed that the two were not fans—and, on the contrary, had disliked the band's music. Despite this, Marilyn Manson (as well as other bands and forms of entertainment, such as movies and video games) were widely criticized by religious, political, and entertainment-industry figures.

A day after the shooting, Michigan State Senator Dale Shugars attended the band's concert, along with policy advisers, a local police officer and the state senate's sergeant-at-arms, at the Van Andel Arena in Grand Rapids, Michigan to conduct research for a proposed bill requiring parental warnings on concert tickets and promotional material for any performer that had released a record bearing the Parental Advisory sticker in the last five years. According to Shugars, the show began with the singer wearing "satanic wings" as he leapt from a cross that was eventually set on fire. He then described seeing fans, whom he described as normal kids, "under [Manson's] control" as he performed a sequence that "glorified the killing of a police officer." Finally, he reported the singer recounting a dream sequence in which cops perform sex acts on him before Jesus Christ descended out of a sky made of LSD and told him the real name of God is "Drugs." After which, the band launched into "I Don't Like the Drugs (But the Drugs Like Me)". Shugars expressed concern that these shows had adverse effects on concert-goers.

On April 25, 1999, longtime music industry critics, Republican former Secretary of Education William Bennett and Democrat US Senator Joseph Lieberman called the group a contributing factor to the massacre during their appearance on Meet the Press. Three days later, the city of Fresno, California passed a unanimous resolution condemning "Marilyn Manson or any other negative entertainer who encourages anger and hate upon the community as an offensive threat to the children of this community." Its author, Councilman Henry Perea, justified the resolution pointing out that people would face arrest if they publicly "engaged in some of the same behaviors that [Manson] demonstrates onstage" In Portsmouth, New Hampshire, students were barred from wearing Marilyn Manson T-shirts in school premises.

 
On April 29, ten US senators (led by Sam Brownback of Kansas) sent a letter to Edgar Bronfman Jr. – the president of Seagram (the owner of Interscope) – requesting a voluntary halt to his company's distribution to children of "music that glorifies violence". The letter named Marilyn Manson for producing songs which "eerily reflect" the actions of Harris and Klebold. The signatories included eight Republicans and two Democrats namely, US Senators Wayne Allard, Ben Nighthorse Campbell, Susan Collins, Tim Hutchinson, Rick Santorum, Kent Conrad, Byron Dorgan, John Ashcroft and Jeff Sessions. Later that day, the band cancelled their remaining North American shows. Two days later, Manson published his response to these accusations in an op-ed piece for Rolling Stone, titled "Columbine: Whose Fault Is It?", where he castigated America's gun culture, the political influence of the National Rifle Association, and the media's irresponsible coverage, which he said facilitated the placing of blame on a scapegoat, instead of debating more relevant societal issues.

On May 4, a hearing on the marketing and distribution of violent content to minors by the television, music, film and video-game industries was held by the United States Senate Committee on Commerce, Science and Transportation. The committee heard testimony from former Secretary of Education and Empower America co-founder William Bennett, the Archbishop of Denver Charles J. Chaput, professors and mental-health professionals. Speakers criticized the band, its label-mate Nine Inch Nails, and the 1999 film The Matrix for their alleged contribution to a cultural environment enabling violence such as the Columbine shootings. The committee requested that the Federal Trade Commission and the United States Department of Justice investigate the entertainment industry's marketing practices to minors. The CEOs of four of the world's largest music distributors declined the invitation to attend. Bennett denounced their absence and said it amounted to a "[p]ublic shaming. My hunch is they will continue to ignore you like they did today." Outside observers such as Nina Crowley, director of the anti-censorship organization Mass Mic, expressed chagrin regarding the hearings, commenting that it was "a very stacked-looking thing." Hilary Rosen, president and CEO of the RIAA, shared this opinion and thought "it was staged as political theater [...] They just wanted to find a way to shame the industry, and I'm not ashamed." 
 
Senators Brownback, Hatch and Lieberman concluded the proceedings by requesting an investigation from the Federal Trade Commission and the United States Department of Justice on marketing practices of the entertainment industry to minors. The following month, President Bill Clinton granted that request lamenting that "kids steeped in the culture of violence do become desensitized to it and more capable of committing it." The release of the FTC report on September 13, led Lieberman, by then the vice presidential candidate on the Democratic ticket, and Hillary Clinton to introduce the Media Marketing Accountability Act of 2001 before the 107th United States Congress. This legislation proposed to ban the entertainment-industry from marketing suspected violent or explicit material to minors.

After concluding the European and Japanese legs of their tour on August 8, the band withdrew from public view. Manson entered into a three-month period of seclusion at his home in the Hollywood Hills, during which he considered how to respond to the Columbine controversy. Manson said the maelstrom made him re-evaluate his career: "There was a bit of trepidation, [in] deciding: 'Is it worth it? Are people understanding what I'm trying to say? Am I even gonna be allowed to say it?' Because I definitely had every single door shut in my face ... there were not a lot of people who stood behind me." He told Alternative Press that he felt his safety was threatened to the point that he "could be shot Mark David Chapman-style." He nevertheless found solace in writing new music which resulted in the band's 2000 album Holy Wood (In the Shadow of the Valley of Death). The singer described this record as his "counterattack."

Recordings
Marilyn Manson released a live video album on November 2, 1999, titled God Is in the T.V. that contained rare and unreleased footage including a behind-the-scenes backstage look at some of the experiences the band underwent during the Rock Is Dead Tour. He also released a live album on November 12, 1999, titled The Last Tour on Earth that documented curated performances by his band from various concerts during the tour.

Lineup
Marilyn Manson
Marilyn Manson: Vocals
John 5: Guitar
Twiggy Ramirez: Bass
Madonna Wayne Gacy: Keyboards
Ginger Fish: Drums

Set List

North America

 "Inauguration of the Mechanical Christ"
 "The Reflecting God"
 "Great Big White World"
 "Get Your Gunn"
 "Mechanical Animals"
 "Sweet Dreams (Are Made of This)" / "Long Hard Road Out of Hell" (Outro)
 "The Speed of Pain"
 "Rock is Dead"
 "The Dope Show"
 "Lunchbox"
 "I Don't Like the Drugs (But the Drugs Like Me)"
 "Irresponsible Hate Anthem"
 "Antichrist Superstar"
 "The Beautiful People"

Europe/Asia

 "Inauguration of the Mechanical Christ"
 "The Reflecting God"
 "Great Big White World"
 "Cake and Sodomy"
 "Sweet Dreams (Are Made of This)" / "Long Hard Road Out of Hell" (Outro)
 "Astonishing Panorama of the Endtimes"
 "Rock is Dead"
 "The Dope Show"
 "Lunchbox"
 "I Don't Like the Drugs (But the Drugs Like Me)"
 "Rock N Roll Nigger"
 "The Beautiful People"

Tour dates

References

Marilyn Manson (band) concert tours
1999 concert tours